Mushroom gravy is a simple sauce that can be composed from stock (beef is typical, but chicken may be used), roux (a mixture of equal parts butter and flour to thicken), and mushroom base.

It can also be enhanced with mace, to add a delicate nutmeg flavor.

See also
 List of gravies
 List of mushroom dishes
 Mushroom sauce

References

Sauces
Mushroom dishes